Anfisa Maksimovna Chernykh (born April 30, 1996) is a Russian actress and model.

Biography 
Was born in Moscow, Russia. She studied at the English grammar school number 297. She studied at the Skryabin Music School  cello and piano and studied at school at Schepkin drama school. After high school Anfisa entered the Russian Academy of Theatre Arts.

In the film debuted in 2009. Lena's role in the social drama directed by Boris Grachevsky Krysha.

She became widely known after the work in the film The Geographer Drank His Globe Away on the novel by Alexei Ivanov. Anfisa starred as Masha Bolshakova, her partner on the film was Konstantin Khabensky, starred as teacher Sluzhkin.

For this role, Anfisa was awarded several film awards, and was nominated Discovery of the Year on Nika Award, but lost to the director Zhora Kryzhovnikov.

She took part and became the winner in the show Last Hero (Season 8), which appeared on TV3 channel in 2019.

Filmography

References

External links

 Анфиса Черных молода и прекрасна
  

1996 births
Living people
Russian film actresses
Russian television actresses
21st-century Russian actresses
Actresses from Moscow